Božidar Ferjančić (17 February 1929 – 28 June 1998) was a Serbian historian, a specialist in medieval Serbian history and the later Byzantine empire. He was member of the Serbian Academy of Sciences and Arts.

Biography
Ferjančić was born in Belgrade, at the time part of the Kingdom of Yugoslavia. Ferjančić graduated with distinction from the Faculty of Philosophy at the University of Belgrade in History in 1953 and after additional study at the same university, he received his doctorate in 1960 with a dissertation entitled Despots in Byzantium and the Lands of the South Slavs. He then taught at the University of Belgrade's Faculty of Philosophy. He advanced rapidly and in 1965 was made associate professor and in 1970 professor. In 1973 he assumed the chairmanship of the Institute for Byzantine Studies after George Ostrogorsky's retirement, a post Ferjančić occupied until his death in 1998. In 1977 he became the director of the institute, a post held by Ostrogorsky before he died in 1976. Ferjančić was made corresponding member of the Serbian Academy of Sciences and Arts in 1978 and a regular member in 1988. He died on 28 June (Vidovdan) in Belgrade.

Work

References

20th-century Serbian historians
Serbian Byzantinists
University of Belgrade Faculty of Philosophy alumni
1929 births
1998 deaths
Members of the Serbian Academy of Sciences and Arts
Balkan studies
Serbian medievalists
Yugoslav historians

Scholars of Byzantine history